Sofya Poghosyan ( born on October 20, 1988) is an Armenian broadcaster, psychologist and actress. She is known for her roles in many Armenian TV-series airing on Shant TV.

Filmography

See also 
 Ashot Ter-Matevosyan

References

External links 

1988 births
Living people
Actresses from Yerevan
Television people from Yerevan
Armenian film actresses
21st-century Armenian actresses
Armenian female models
Armenian television presenters
Armenian Apostolic Christians
Armenian women television presenters
Models from Yerevan